Plutonia (Плутония) is an early science fiction novel by Russian academician Vladimir Obruchev. It was written in 1915 in Kharkov and first published in the original Russian in 1924.

Plot
The title Plutonia refers to the novel's setting in a lost land. It is an underground world having its own sun, called Pluto for the Roman god of the underworld. The terrain is marked by dramatic geographic features and inhabited by prehistoric animals and primitive people. These are essentially the animal and plant life of previous geological periods in their natural surroundings. As the characters venture deeper into the underground area, they encounter more and more ancient life forms, back to dinosaurs and other Jurassic species.

Prehistoric animals featured

Non-avian dinosaurs
 Ceratosaurus
 Diplodocus
 Iguanodon
 Stegosaurus
 Triceratops

Other extinct reptiles
 Deinosuchus
 Ichthyosaurus
 Megalochelys
 Plesiosaurus
 Pteranodon
 Unidentified Archosaur

Other prehistoric animals included

Mammals
 Cave Bear
 Cave Lion
 Glyptodon
 Gomphotherium
 Megacerops
 Megaloceros
 Neanderthal
 Paraceratherium
 Smilodon
 Uintatherium
 Unidentified Creodont
 Woolly Mammoth
 Woolly Rhino

Birds
 Archaeopteryx
 Hesperornis

In translation
Besides English, the novel has been published in other languages: Spanish (1953), German (1953), Finnish (1954), Ukrainian (1955), French (1955), Czech (1941), Hungarian (1956), Romanian (1956), Latvian (1957), Portuguese (1960), and Polish (1966).

See also 
Hollow Earth
Lost world (genre)
Pellucidar

References

1915 science fiction novels
1924 science fiction novels
Novels about dinosaurs
Novels set in prehistory
Russian science fiction novels
Novels set in subterranea
Lost world novels
Hollow Earth in fiction